The 2019 Turkish Basketball Cup was the 34th edition of Turkey's top-tier level professional national domestic basketball cup competition. The tournament was held from 13–17 February 2019 in the Ankara Arena in Ankara, Turkey. Fenerbahçe Beko won the competition by defeating Anadolu Efes 80–70 in the final.

Qualified teams 
The top eight placed teams after the first half of the top-tier level Basketball Super League 2018–19 season qualified for the tournament. The four highest placed teams played the lowest seeded teams in the quarter-finals. The competition was played under a single elimination format.

Bracket

Final

Most Valuable Player

See also
2018–19 Basketbol Süper Ligi

References

Turkish Cup Basketball seasons
Cup